Kazemi, Kazimi, Kazmi, or al-Kadhimi  is a surname found most commonly in Iran, Syria, Iraq, Afghanistan, Pakistan and India. The surname is conventionally used by people who trace their patrilineal descent from Imam Musa al-Kazim, thus the lineage belongs to the Sayyid community. Kazmi people are direct descendants of Prophet Muhammad through his daughter Fatima.Sayyid is a title of respect, esp. for royal personages.Musa al-Kadhim is revered as the seventh successor of Muhammad by Shia Muslims i.e., he is the seventh Imam of Twelver Shias. Considering their etymology, the terms Musavi and Kazmi can be used interchangebly (since both have been derived from Imam Musa al-Kazim). The surname Kazmi is more commonly used by the Musavi Sayyids of the Indian Subcontinent.

Notable people with this surname

Kazmi
 Ahmad Saeed Kazmi (1913–1986), Sufi scholar from Multan, Pakistan
 Iqbal Kazmi, Pakistani human rights activist and journalist
 Nasir Kazmi, Urdu poet from Pakistan
 Nikhat Kazmi, film critic from India
 Pratima Kazmi, Indian television actress
 Rahat Kazmi, Pakistani television actor, talk-show anchor and academic
 Shah Abdul Latif Kazmi (1617–1705), known as Bari Imam, Sufi poet and philosopher

Kazemi
 Arsalan Kazemi, Iranian basketball player
 Elham Kazemi, Iranian–American mathematics educator
 Farhad Kazemi, Iranian football manager
 Hadi Kazemi, Iranian actor
 Hossein Kazemi (born 1979), Iranian footballer
 Sayed Mustafa Kazemi (1962–2007), Afghan politician
 Sahel Kazemi (died 2009), murderer of retired NFL football star Steve McNair
 Zahra Kazemi (1949–2003), Iranian-Canadian journalist 
 Zhaleh Kazemi (1944–2005), Iranian painter and news anchor

Kazimi
 Ali Kazimi (born 1961), Canadian filmmaker, media artist and writer

Kadhimi
 Mustafa Al-Kadhimi, Prime Minister of Iraq since 2020

Fictional characters
 Carmel Kazemi, EastEnders
 Darius Kazemi, EastEnders
 Kush Kazemi, EastEnders
 Shakil Kazemi, EastEnders
 Umar Kazemi, EastEnders

References

Al-Moussawi family
Arabic-language surnames
Iranian-language surnames
Shi'ite surnames